Pieter van der Aa (Leiden, 1659 – Leiden, August 1733) was a Dutch publisher best known for preparing maps and atlases, though he also printed pirated editions of foreign bestsellers and illustrated volumes. He also printed many maps that were often out of print, which he reissued. Some of his most popular maps were of the African continent, detailing locations such as Morocco and Madagascar. Many of his later works were printed for the general public in French and Dutch.

Early life and family 

Pieter van der Aa was born the son of a German stonecutter from Holstein, one of three sons who came to run a family printing business. His brother Boudewyn was a printer and his other brother Hildebrand a copper plate engraver.

Career 

Pieter van der Aa began his career at Leiden in 1683 as a Latin trade publisher, publishing classical texts pertaining to medicine and science. As he progressed, he began to publish atlases and maps, compiling numerous multi-volume collections of works. His ambition to become Leiden's most famous printer was fulfilled in 1715 with his appointment to head printer for the city and its university. One of Pieter van der Aa's largest compilations relates to the history of Italy and Sicily, an area of immense personal interest. Though he took credit for many of his compilations, several, such as the Dutch collection of travels to the East and West Indies, were admittedly simple improvements to others' works.

Legacy 

The orchid genus Aa is said to be named after him by the botanist Heinrich Gustav Reichenbach because he was the printer for the Dutch botanist Paul Hermann's "Paradisus Batavus". Published posthumously in 1698, this explanation is disputed.

Published atlases 
 Nouvel Atlas
 and the sixty-six volume Galerie Agréable du Monde [Leiden, 1728], of which only 100 copies are said to have been printed.
 Van der Aa, Pieter – F. Draakx schipvaart door de straat en Zuyd Zee gedaan om de gantsen aardkloot. – Leiden, Van der Aa 1706-08 [16 x 23,2 cm]
 Van der Aa, Pieter – Zee-togten door Thomas Candys na de West Indien, en van daar rondom den gantzen aardkloot gedaan.
 Van der Aa, Pieter – *T Noorder deel van Amerika. Door C.Kolumbus in zyn.. Leiden, Van der Aa 1706–08 [16 x 23,6 cm]
 Van der AA, Pieter – Amerika of de Nieuwe Weereld Aller eerst Door C. Kolumbus; Leiden, 1705
 Van der Aa, Piter – Niew (Niue) Engeland in twee Scheeptogten door..John Smith.. Leiden, 1705
 Vander Aa, Pieter – De voor Eylanden van America.. Florida, New Mexico,... Leiden, 1705
 Van der Aa, Pieter,  T Vaste Land van Darien ten Zuiden Cuba en Hispaniola Gelege – Leiden, 1705
 Van der Aa, Pieter –  Cuba en Jamaica, soo als die door Kolombus.. Leiden, 1705
 Van der Aa, Pieter –  Reys togt door Thomas Coryat van Jerusalem; Leiden, 1705
 Van der Aa, Pieter –  De zee en land-reysen vandenridder Hendrik Blunt.; Leiden, 1705
 Van der Aa, Pieter –  Melite Insula vulgo Malta; Leiden, 1712
 Van der Aa, Pieter –  Valetta Civitas Nova Maltae olim Millitae; Leiden, 1712
 The plates in the Leiden University Catalogus librorum of 1716 in Quaerendo, 22, 1992, p. 271–284, ill.

Gallery

References

External links 

 Various maps by van der Aa  Eran Laor Cartographic Collection. The National Library of Israel

1659 births
1733 deaths
17th-century Dutch cartographers
People from Leiden
Dutch publishers (people)
Dutch people of German descent